This is a list of American fishers, denoting fishers who have been involved in various aspects of fishing, commercial fishing and recreational fishing.

American fishers

  Joseph H. Acklen 
  Ted Ames – a Maine fisherman, and former hatchery director of Penobscot East Resource Center 
  Alan Austerman 
  Michael de Avila 
  Dan Bailey 
  Carrie G. Stevens 
  Dianna Clark 
  Luke Clausen 
  Rick Clunn – a professional bass fisherman from La Porte, Texas who currently resides in Ava, Missouri
  Bill Dance (television host) 
  George M. Daniel 
  Mark Davis (fisherman) 
  James Deren 
  E.W. Edwards 
  Kim Elton 
  Harold Ensley
  S. Kip Farrington
  Everett Garrison 
  Red Fisher (sportsman) 
  Gadabout Gaddis 
  Jack Gartside 
  George F. Grant 
  Todd Graves (entrepreneur) 
  Linda Greenlaw 
  Zane Grey 
  Tom Hanlon (politician) 
  Ernest Hemingway 
  Jack Hemingway 

  Charles Frederick Holder 
  Jimmy Houston 
  Michael Iaconelli 
  Ben Johnson (chairman) 
  Larry Larsen 
  James Larsin 
  Loren Leman 
  H.L. Leonard 
  Paul H. Young 
  Al Lindner 
  Ron Lindner 
  Pete Maina 
  Scott McAdams 
  Peter Miller (Host) 
  Charisse Millett 
  Joseph Monninger 
  Frank Mundus 
  Richard Murphy (Captain) 
  Larry Nixon 
  Riki Ott 
  Cliff Pace 
  Sarah Palin 
  Todd Palin 
  Hank Parker – a professional bass fisherman in the United States
  Hank Parker Jr. 
  George Poveromo 
  Skeet Reese 
  Louis Rhead 
  Tom Rosenbauer 
  Jim Saric 
  Bill Schaadt 
  Paul Schwinghammer – a bass angler in Minnesota who began his fishing career in 2006 with two top 20 finishes
  Ray Scott (angler) 
  Paul Seaton 
  William Shakespeare (inventor) 
  Ben Stevens 
  Ron P. Swegman 
  Gerald Swindle 
  Bill Thomas (Alaska politician) 
  Kevin VanDam 
  Edward vom Hofe 
  Lowell Wakefield 
  Dean Ween 
  O'Neill Williams 
  Ted Williams 
  Babe Winkelman 
  Forrest L. Wood 
  Joan Wulff 
  Ed Zern

See also

References

 
Fishers
Recreational fishing in the United States